Donald W. “Don” Slager is the former Chief Executive Officer of Republic Services, Inc., in the recycling and waste services business. The Company generates $10 billion of annual revenue, has a market cap exceeding $23+ billion and operates the 7th largest vocational fleet in the nation. Don has more than 35 years of experience in the industry, starting his career as a teenager and subsequently working at all levels within the organization. He had served Republic for over 30 years. Slager retired and Jon Vander Ark was appointed the position of CEO on June 26, 2021 following a well executed succession plan.

Career
In his career, he has served in a wide variety of leadership positions, including as President and Chief Operating Officer of Republic, prior to becoming CEO in 2011. Don also served as President and Chief Operating Officer of Allied Waste Industries from 2003 until Republic's acquisition of Allied Waste in December 2008. Previously, he held various management roles of increasing responsibility at Allied (and formerly National Waste Services) from 1985 through 2008, including Senior Vice President, Operations, Region President, Area President and General Manager.  Don Slager has been associated with the Bridgeton Landfill, the Environmental Protection Agency's West Lake Super Fund Site in Bridgeton, Missouri, a St. Louis suburb, since December 30, 1997.  At the time, as a company officer of Allied Waste, Slager signed the 1997 merger agreement that registered Bridgeton Landfill in Delaware, a state known for its strict corporate secrecy laws.

Education
Don earned a certificate from the Stanford University Board Consortium Development Program and completed the Northwestern University Kellogg School Advanced Executive Program.

Awards and recognition 
Under Slager's leadership, Republic Services was named to:

Barron's 100 Most Sustainable Companies (2019, 2018)
Ethisphere's World's Most Ethical Companies (2019, 2018, 2017) 
 Robeco SAM's Sustainability Yearbook (2018) 
Robeco SAM Sustainability Award, Bronze Class (2019)
 Forbes World's Most Innovative Companies (2018) 
Forbes listed the company as one of America's best employers for women in 2019.
 Forbes America's Best Large Employers (2017) 
 Dow Jones Sustainability (DJSI) World and North America Indices (2019, 2018, 2017, 2016) 
Human Rights Campaign's Best Places to Work for LGBTQ Equality (2018, 2017, 2016) 
Certified as a "Great Place to Work." (2019, 2018, 2017)

Individual awards:

 Forbes named Slager one of the country's most innovative leaders in September 2019.
Glassdoor rated Don Slager among its “100 Highest Rated CEOs” for 2017. The selection was based on the anonymous reviews of Republic Services employees, earning Slager an overall rating of 94%.
 Slager won CR Magazine's 2017 Responsible CEO of the Year-Lifetime Achievement Award.
 Slager was named the “Top CEO” in the 2012 Institutional Investor All-American Executive Team rankings in the Business, Education, and Professional Services sector.

Board memberships
In addition to serving on Republic's Board of Directors since June 2010, Don currently serves on the Board of Martin Marietta Materials, a supplier of aggregates and heavy building materials. He is a member of the Finance Committee and the Ethics, Environment, Safety & Health Committee. He is also a member of the Board of the Arizona Commerce Authority, and a governing board member of Together for Safer Roads, an innovative coalition that brings together global private sector companies, across industries, to collaborate on improving road safety. From September 2009 until March 2016, Don served on the Board of UTi Worldwide as Chairman of its Nominating and Corporate Governance Committee and member of its Compensation Committee.

References

External links
 Interview with Don Slager

1963 births
Living people
21st-century American businesspeople
American corporate directors